The Association of Writers of Republika Srpska (Удружење књижевника Српске) is Republika Srpska's official writing association.

History
The association was founded in 1993 on the Jahorina under president Nikola Koljević who was a professor and politician. From 2003, the president of the association Zoran Kostić moved the headquarters from Srpsko Sarajevo to Banja Luka.

First management 
The first management of three members was chosen by a secret vote. The management was:
Nikola Koljević, president
Nikola Vukolić, vicepresident
Ranko Popović, secretary.

Awards
Ribbon for life achievement
Kočić award
UKS plaque
Đuro Damjanović award
Book of the Year award

See also
 Association of Writers of Bosnia and Herzegovina

References

Culture of Republika Srpska
Bosnia and Herzegovina writers' organizations